The 1972 South Dakota gubernatorial election was held on November 7, 1972, to elect a Governor of South Dakota. It was the last election in South Dakota to elect the governor for a two-year term after a 1972 state constitutional amendment established a four-year term. Democratic nominee Richard F. Kneip was re-elected, defeating Republican nominee Carveth Thompson.

Democratic primary

Candidates
Richard F. Kneip, incumbent Governor of South Dakota

Republican primary

Candidates
 Carveth Thompson, member of the South Dakota House of Representatives
 Simon W. Chance

Results

General election

Results

References

1972
South Dakota
Gubernatorial